Cheddi Jagan International Airport , formerly Timehri International Airport, is the primary airport of Guyana. It is the larger of the two international airports serving Georgetown with the other airport being the Eugene F. Correira International Airport.

History

The United States obtained rights to locate military facilities in British Guiana as part of the Destroyers for Bases Agreement with the United Kingdom in 1941. On 14 June 1941, the first United States Army forces arrived to survey land for a bomber airfield near Georgetown.

The forest was cleared and hills were levelled and a long concrete runway was constructed. On 20 June 1941, the airfield officially opened with the activation of a weather station. The station was named after Lieutenant Colonel Bert M. Atkinson, a United States Army Air Service World War I aviator. Colonel Atkinson was the commander of the 1st Pursuit Wing on the western front in 1918. Colonel Atkinson retired from the Army in 1922 after a distinguished career and died on 27 April 1937.

The mission of the station was the defense of the colony against German U-boats. The airfield was also a major staging point for American aircraft crossing the Atlantic Ocean heading to the European Theatre on the South Atlantic transport route. Aircraft supplied to the British forces by the United States were flown to Atkinson where they were turned over and ferried to North Africa. With the discovery of bauxite deposits in northeast Brazil in 1943, the mission of the airfield was expanded to protect the coastline of northeast South America and prevent any submarine landings by Axis forces on the continent.

United States Army Air Forces 430th Bombardment Squadron 9th Bombardment Group was assigned to Atkinson field from 4 November 1941 to 31 October 1942 flying anti-submarine sorties in Douglas B-18 bombers. The 430th was replaced by a detachment of the 35th Bombardment Squadron (25th Bombardment Group) from 1 November 1942 to 7 October 1943. After the detection of U-boat activity was taken over by the United States Navy, the 91st Reconnaissance Squadron (344th Reconnaissance Group) was assigned to the airfield during 1944 and 1945 flying the F-10 photo-recon version of the B-25 Mitchell bomber on various mapping missions.

At the end of the war, Atkinson Field was reduced in scope to a skeleton staff. The facility was opened for all air travel, including commercial air flights on 1 October 1946. The same year, British West Indian Airways (BWIA, now Caribbean Airlines) was operating nonstop passenger service to Port of Spain, Trinidad. The military airfield was designated Atkinson Air Force Base on 26 March 1948 by Department of the Air Force General Order Number 10. The base was ordered closed on 31 July 1949 due to budgetary cutbacks. The final military cadre was 3 officers and 25 enlisted men upon closure, and the base was officially turned over to British authorities on 1 August 1949.

A modern terminal building was built and opened on 15 March 1952. When the new building was ravaged by fire on 5 August 1959 the old terminal building was renovated and used again until the destroyed building was replaced.

The airport had jet service in 1961 when Pan American World Airways (Pan Am) was operating Boeing 707 flights with a weekly round trip routing of Paramaribo - Georgetown - Port of Spain - Barbados - New York City. At this same time, Pan Am was also operating weekly Douglas DC-6 propliner service on a routing of Belém - Cayenne - Paramaribo - Georgetown - Port of Spain - Caracas - Curacao - Port Au Prince - Miami. Also in 1961, British West Indian Airways (BWIA) was operating all flights from the airport with Vickers Viscount turboprop aircraft with nonstop service to Port of Spain with direct one stop service to Barbados. BWIA then introduced jet service with Boeing 727-100 aircraft during the mid 1960s and by 1966 was operating all of its passenger service into the airport with the 727 on nonstop flights to Port of Spain and also to Paramaribo in addition to all-cargo flights nonstop to Port of Spain and direct to Miami operated with Douglas DC-4 prop aircraft.

The lease of the facility by the United States was formally terminated on 26 May 1966 (Guyana's Independence Day). Because the lease was terminated 74 years before its end date, a new agreement was reached giving certain specified rights to the United States in relation to the air base for the next 17 years.

In 1965 and 1968 additions were made to the airport facilities. Also in 1968, British West Indian Airways (BWIA) was operating direct, no change of plane Boeing 727-100 jet service to New York City via JFK Airport via intermediate stops in Port of Spain and Barbados. On 1 May 1969, the Atkinson Aerodrome was renamed the Timehri International Airport – "Timehri" is a Carib word for rock motifs located deep in the Guyana hinterland that pre-date the arrival of Europeans in the New World. The airport featured murals employing Amerindian motifs by Guyanese painter Aubrey Williams. In 1971, BWIA was operating daily nonstop service to Port of Spain from the airport with Boeing 707 jetliners. By 1973, ALM Antillean Airlines was operating Douglas DC-9 jet service on a routing of Paramaribo - Georgetown - Port of Spain - Curacao - Kingston - Miami three times a week according to the Official Airline Guide (OAG). Air France was serving the airport in 1977 with round trip service flown twice weekly on a Pointe-a-Pitre - Fort-de-France - Port of Spain - Georgetown - Paramaribo - Cayenne routing operated with a Boeing 737-200. Pan American World Airways (Pan Am) was serving the airport in 1980 with daily one stop Boeing 707 jet service to New York JFK Airport via an intermediate stop in Port of Spain. In 1981, Guy-America Airways was operating nonstop Boeing 707 jet service between New York JFK Airport and Guyana three days a week.

In 1983, according to the Official Airline Guide (OAG), four airlines were operating scheduled passenger air service at the airport: ALM Antillean Airlines, Arrow Air, British West Indies Airways (BWIA, formerly British West Indian Airways) and Guyana Airways. At this time, ALM was operating McDonnell Douglas MD-80 jet service nonstop to Port of Spain, Trinidad, with one stop direct MD-80 flights to Curacao, U.S.-based Arrow Air was flying nonstop Boeing 707 jet service to JFK Airport in New York City, BWIA was operating nonstop McDonnell Douglas DC-9-50 jet flights to Port of Spain and locally based Guyana Airways was flying Boeing 707 nonstop service to Barbados, Miami, New York JFK Airport, Paramaribo, Suriname and Port of Spain. The OAG also lists local and regional flights operated by Guyana Airways with Hawker Siddeley 748 and de Havilland Canada DHC-6 Twin Otter turboprop aircraft at this time. Guyana Airways had earlier operated Boeing 737-200 jet service from the airport in 1981 with nonstop flights to Barbados, Miami, Paramaribo and Port of Spain. By 1989, two airlines were operating nonstop flights between the airport and New York JFK: Guyana Airways with three Boeing 707 flights a week and Tropical Airways flying stretched Super Douglas DC-8 jets twice a week. In 1993, Guyana Airways was operating nonstop Boeing 757-200 flights from GEO to New York JFK Airport three days a week while BWIA and Leisure Air were operating direct one stop flights from New York JFK Airport, BWIA with McDonnell Douglas MD-80 jets five days a week via an intermediate stop in Antigua and Leisure Air with Airbus A320 jets once a week via an intermediate stop in St. Lucia. In 1995 Barbados-based Carib Express was operating British Aerospace BAe 146-100 jet service to destinations in the Caribbean.

In March 1997, following the death of President Dr. Cheddi Jagan, then-President Samuel Hinds decided to rename the airport the Cheddi Jagan International Airport. The proposition to rename the airport was proposed in the Parliament (National Assembly) by the Minister of Amerindian Affairs, Vibert De Souza, who noted that it would be a fitting tribute to a man who had spent his life committed to the betterment of Amerindian people and fighting for the freedom and unity of all Guyanese. A plaque bearing the new name was unveiled on 21 May 1997 by the Prime Minister, Janet Jagan.

The Cheddi Jagan International Airport underwent a 150 million dollar modernization and expansion. The runway was extended to about 10,500 feet and the expansion provided a new arrivals terminal building with eight boarding bridges, elevators and CCTV. This was completed in December 2018. However, the check-in facility opened at the same time. In March 2023, British Airways will commence service to London's Gatwick Airport via St. Lucia aboard Boeing 777 aircraft.

Facilities
The terminal has six ground level gates and four boarding bridges.

Airlines and destinations

Passenger

Cargo

Accidents and incidents
On 30 July 2011, Caribbean Airlines Flight 523 overran a runway in rainy weather while landing at Cheddi Jagan International Airport and went through a chain-link perimeter fence. The aircraft, a Boeing 737-800, broke in two just behind the first class cabin. There were no fatalities, although at least two passengers suffered broken legs and many others suffered lacerations and other injuries. Caribbean Airlines confirmed that 157 passengers and 6 crew members were on board the aircraft at the time.

On 9 November 2018, Fly Jamaica Airways Flight 256, bound for Toronto, overshot the runway when making an emergency landing for technical issues in the Boeing 757's hydraulics. This caused significant damage to the aircraft and one passenger fatality. The airliner involved, B757-200 registration N524AT was deemed beyond economical repair and written-off.

References

External links
Cheddi Jagan International Airport, official site

Airports in Guyana
Airports established in 1941
Demerara-Mahaica
Destroyers for Bases Agreement airfields
Airfields of the United States Army Air Forces Air Transport Command on the South Atlantic Route
Airfields of the United States Army Air Forces
1941 establishments in British Guiana
World War II sites in British Guiana